Omotu Bissong (born Cecilia Ohumotu Bissong) is a Nigerian model, television presenter, and actress, best known as Funke Lawal in Desperate Housewives Africa.

Early years
A native of Yala, Cross River State,  Bissong started her modelling career when she was a child. She attended Nigerian Navy Primary school and Nigerian Navy Secondary school, both in Navy Town, Lagos, the latter she completed at the age of fourteen. She would later enroll as a student of the University of Calabar where she studied Economics.

Pageants
In 2003, Bissong – then credited as Celia Bissong – made history by becoming the first Most Beautiful Girl in Nigeria winner from the South-South (Regina Askia, another South-South native, had only won by default when she replaced Bianca Onoh in 1989). Her platform was HIV/AIDS Awareness, and Tourism Promotion, and her reign saw her compete at Miss Universe and Miss World.

Modelling
Bissong worked as a model in Nigeria before moving to America, where she signed up with another model agency whilst studying Accounting at the City University of New York. In an interview with The Vanguard in 2008, Bissong criticised discrimination against black models in the American fashion industry, and admitted she was facing strong competition. Upon her return to Nigeria, she opened a model management company in a bid to restore professionalism in the industry.

Television
Since returning to her home country in 2009, Bissong has worked in television, presenting The Peak Talent Hunt Show, and Africa Awakes on DSTV. As an actress, Bissong was in the Ghanaian movie Be My Guest with Nadia Buari and Chris Attoh, and is currently starring in the African adaptation of Desperate Housewives as stay-at-home mother Funke Lawal loosely based on Lynette Scavo in the original series.

References

1980s births
City University of New York alumni
Living people
Miss Universe 2003 contestants
Miss World 2003 delegates
Most Beautiful Girl in Nigeria winners
Nigerian female models
University of Calabar alumni
Nigerian television presenters
Nigerian beauty pageant contestants
21st-century Nigerian actresses
Most Beautiful Girl in Nigeria contestants
Nigerian television actresses
Nigerian film actresses
Actresses from Cross River State
Nigerian television personalities
Nigerian television talk show hosts